The Right Reverend Henry Cecil Read  was an Anglican bishop in India from 1944 to 1957.

He was born on, Christmas Day 1890, educated at Wellington College and Caius and ordained in 1915. He was a CMS Missionary until he became Principal St Andrew Divinity School in 1930, a post he held for nine years. From 1940 to 1944 he was Archdeacon of Aurangabad when he became Bishop of Nasik. He was a Canon Residentiary at Rochester Cathedral until 1961 and died on 29 May 1963.

Notes

1890 births
People educated at Wellington College, Berkshire
Alumni of Gonville and Caius College, Cambridge
Anglican archdeacons in India
Anglican bishops of Nasik
1963 deaths
British expatriates in India
Anglican missionaries in India
English Anglican missionaries